The Massachusetts State Association was a minor league baseball league that played briefly in the 1884 season. The Non-Signatory, Independent level league consisted of franchises based exclusively in Massachusetts. The Massachusetts State Association was an eight–team league that permanently folded after a partial 1884 season.

League member Boston Reserves were owned and operated by the major league Boston Beaneaters and may have been the first true baseball farm team.

History
Formed for the 1884 season, the Massachusetts State Association began play on May 1, 1884, as an eight–team league, with teams scheduled for one or two games per week. The league was a Non-Signatory Independent level league under president M. H. Nichols. The league lost four teams during the season, on July 21, 1884.

The Massachusetts State Association played in 1884. The charter members were the Boston Reserves and teams from Holyoke, Massachusetts, Lawrence, Massachusetts, Lynn, Massachusetts, Salem, Massachusetts, Springfield, Massachusetts, Waltham, Massachusetts and Worcester, Massachusetts.

The 1884 Boston Reserves were the first minor league baseball team to play in Boston, Massachusetts. The Reserves were owned and operated by the Boston Beaneaters of the National League and may have been the first true baseball farm team.

On July 21, 1884, the Worcester, Waltham, Lynn and Salem teams all disbanded, leaving the Massachusetts State Association with four remaining teams. The league concluded play on August 15, 1884. The Massachusetts State Association standings were led by 1st place Springfield with a 12–5 record, 1.0 games ahead of the 2nd place Boston Reserves (13–8), followed by Holyoke (7–11) and Lawrence (7–15). Lynn (4–8), Salem (2–11), Waltham (9–6) and Worcester (11–4) had previously folded.

After the season, the Massachusetts State Association permanently folded, playing only the 1884 season.

Massachusetts State Association teams

Standings & statistics

1884 Massachusetts State Association
  Worcester, Waltham, Lynn and Salem disbanded July 21.

Notable alumni

Bill Annis, Boston
Dick Blaisdell, Lynn
Marty Barrett, Boston
Jack Carney, Salem
Peter Connell, Springfield
John Connor, Boston
Charlie Daniels, Lawrence
Jim Donnelly, Lynn
Wally Fessenden, Lynn
Jocko Flynn, Lawrence
Bernie Graham, Worcester
Tom Gunning, Boston
Mike Hines, Boston 
Al Hubbard, Springfield
Jerry Hurley, Boston/Lawrence
Mike Jordan, Lawrence
John Kiley, Lawrence
Jim Manning, Boston 
Chippy McGarr, Worcester
Jack McGeachey, Holyoke
Cyclone Miller, Springfield
George Moolic, Lawrence
Gene Moriarty, Boston
Billy Murray, Salem
Henry Oxley, Lynn
Charlie Reilley, Worcester
Bill Rollinson , Holyoke
Jimmy Ryan, Holyoke
Pat Scanlon, Holyoke
Mike Sullivan, Lawrence/Worcester
Ed Trumbull, Holyoke
Tommy Tucker, Holyoke

References

External Link
Baseball Reference

1884 establishments in Massachusetts
1884 disestablishments in Massachusetts
Defunct minor baseball leagues in the United States
Baseball leagues in Massachusetts
Defunct professional sports leagues in the United States
Sports leagues established in 1884
Sports leagues disestablished in 1884